Friesenheim is a municipality in the Ortenau district of Baden-Württemberg, Germany.

History
Friesenheim was mediatized to the Grand Duchy of Baden in 1803. It was assigned to the district of Lahr. Friesenheim was subsequently assigned to the newly organized Ortenau district. From 1972 to 1975, Friesenheim absorbed the towns of Heiligenzell, Oberschopfheim, Oberweier, and Schuttern.

Geography
The municipality (Gemeinde) of Friesenheim is located in the Ortenau district of Baden-Württemberg, one of the 16 States of the Federal Republic of Germany.

Politics
Friesenheim has five boroughs (Ortsteile) – Friesenheim, Heiligenzell, Oberschopfheim, Oberweier, and Schuttern – and two villages: Leutkirche and Riedmühle. Also located in the municipal area is the Am Bahnhof industrial district and the abandoned villages of Leimbach, Schutterweiler, and Sternenberg.

Coat of arms
Friesenheim's municipal coat of arms is divided party per pale into a right, yellow half containing a red plowshare, and a red half with a white billhook. The Ortenau district office reapproved the coat of arms for municipal use and issued a corresponding flag to Friesenheim on 8 August 1977.

Transportation
Friesenheim is connected to Germany's network of roadways by the Bundesstraße 3 and its railway system by the Mannheim–Karlsruhe–Basel railway.

References

External links

  (in German)

Ortenaukreis